Yumiko Yamano (born 1988) is a Japanese team handball player. She plays on the Japanese national team, and participated at the 2011 World Women's Handball Championship in Brazil.

References

1988 births
Living people
Japanese female handball players